Mount Baxter is a peak along the crest of the Sierra Nevada in California. Mount Baxter is on the boundary between Kings Canyon National Park and the John Muir Wilderness just north of Baxter Pass and to the northeast of the Rae Lakes, a popular backpacking destination along the John Muir Trail.

Mount Baxter is named for John Baxter, who was a rancher in the Owens Valley.

The mountain provides habitat for the endangered Sierra Nevada bighorn sheep and was closed to entry in the recent past.

References 

Mountains of Kings Canyon National Park
Mountains of Inyo County, California
Mountains of Fresno County, California
Mountains of Northern California
Mountains of the John Muir Wilderness